Walnut Grove is an unincorporated community and census-designated place (CDP) in Hardin County, Tennessee. Walnut Grove is located on Tennessee State Route 69, north of the Alabama border. As of the 2010 census, its population was 396.

References

Census-designated places in Hardin County, Tennessee
Census-designated places in Tennessee
Unincorporated communities in Tennessee
Unincorporated communities in Hardin County, Tennessee